American singer and songwriter Børns has released two studio albums, two live albums, two extended plays, 11 singles (including one as a featured artist), and five music videos. Børns released his first EP, A Dream Between, in 2012, and released his debut studio album, Dopamine, on October 16, 2015.

Albums

Studio albums

Live albums

Extended plays

Singles

As lead artist

As featured artist

Music videos

Notes

References

External links
 
 
 
 

Discographies of American artists
Pop music discographies